The Royal Army Dental Corps (RADC) is a specialist corps in the British Army that provides dental health services to British Army personnel and their families in war and in peace. The corps is a part of the British Army's Army Medical Services.

History

While army regimental surgeons had been providing dental care services to soldiers since circa 1660, it was not until 1901 that a dental service branch was formally established under the Royal Army Medical Corps (RAMC), but in 1908 this was dissolved and the Army returned to contracting civilian dentists. It was re-established at the outbreak of the First World War in 1914. In January 1921, dentists of the RAMC were split off into a separate Army Dental Corps (ADC). The corps was awarded the "royal" prefix to become the Royal Army Dental Corps in November 1946 in recognition of its service in the Second World War.

Royal Army Dental Corps specialisations
Qualified dentists are all commissioned officers. Dental nurses are non-commissioned officers.

They initially enlisted for seven years with the colours and a further five years with the reserve. They trained at the Royal Army Medical Corps Depot, Crookham Camp, Aldershot, before proceedings to specialist trade training. The two trades available at that time were Clerk Orderly (who assisted in the operating room and in clerical work) and Dental Mechanic (who worked in dental workshops).

Alliances
 – Royal Canadian Dental Corps
 – Royal Australian Army Dental Corps
 – Royal New Zealand Dental Corps

Order of precedence

References

External links
Official site
Royal Army Dental Corps Association

British administrative corps
Corps of the British Army in World War II
Dental organisations based in the United Kingdom
Medical units and formations of the British Army
Military dentistry
Military units and formations established in 1921
1921 establishments in the United Kingdom